"Whopper Whopper" is a song and television advertisement by American fast food chain Burger King to promote their signature hamburger, the Whopper. The song is part of Burger King's advertising campaign You Rule and is a variation of The Burger King jingle. Beacon Street Studios developed the song and other versions of it. The advertisement was released on November 2022 while the song, along with "Burger Cheese Burger Cheese", was released as a single onto Spotify on February 3, 2023.

Lyrics
The lyrics to the Burger King Whopper song are as follows:

Reception
Reception towards the song is mixed, with some people liking it and others finding it irritating. News outlets have described the song as viral, catchy, and an earworm. During the 2023 NFL playoffs, some fans expressed frustration at hearing the song during ad breaks. In 2023, the advertisement was not played at Super Bowl LVII, with Burger King instead opting to release the song on Spotify. The song has now become an Internet meme.

References

Burger King advertising
2020s television commercials
Internet memes introduced in 2022